Fischer's shrew (Crocidura fischeri) is a species of mammal in the family Soricidae. It is found in Kenya and Tanzania. Its natural habitat is dry savanna.

Sources
 Hutterer, R. & Oguge, N. 2004.  Crocidura fischeri.   2006 IUCN Red List of Threatened Species.   Downloaded on 30 July 2007.

Fischer's shrew
Mammals of Kenya
Mammals of Tanzania
Fischer's shrew
Taxonomy articles created by Polbot